Roosevelt County refers to the following counties in the United States:

Roosevelt County, Montana
Roosevelt County, New Mexico